Rondo is a   Moscow rock band formed in 1984.

History 
The band was formed in 1984, jazz saxophonist, composer and arranger Michael Litvin, and rather quickly produced the first successful magnitoalbum Turnips. Group Rondo playing style New wave music,   instrumental jazz-rock compositions. Changed several vocalists and keyboardists, while in the group does not approve, Alexander Ivanov and Yevgeny Rubanov. From 1985 to 1986, vocalist was Nikolay Rastorguyev.

In 1987, Mikhail Litvin dismisses the old structure and enlists new musicians. For a while the two Rondos co-exist in Moscow. In 1988, Michael Litvin emigrated to the United States, but his musicians continued to perform under the same name. In 1989, a court decision awards the rights for the name of a group to Alexander Ivanov's group.

In 1997, Alexander Ivanov begins his solo career. For a while, he combines his solo career with the work in the group. In 1998, in the concert hall "Russia" a presentation was held of the disc Past-Live, recorded during the jubilee concert band together with friends from Gorky Park.

March 27, 2003 a new album  Сoda was released. Same year, Ivanov officially announces the collapse of the group.

Since 2005, it resumed the title Rondo, and now the poster looks like this: Alexander Ivanov and Rondo.

In April and May 2022, Alexander Ivanov and Rondo participated in a series of concerts organized in order to support the 2022 Russian invasion of Ukraine.

References

External links
 Официальный сайт группы
 

Russian rock music groups
Musical groups established in 1984
Musical groups disestablished in 2002
Musical groups from Moscow
Soviet rock music groups